Rothman is a surname. Notable people with the surname include:
 Barbara Katz Rothman (born 1948), sociologist
 Benny Rothman (1911–2002), political activist
 David Rothman (statistician) (1935–2004), statistician
 David Rothman (medical historian), professor of medicine
 Einar Rothman (1888–1952), Swedish track and field athlete
 Elise Rothman, fictional character from the television series Charmed
 Gertjan Rothman (born 1983), Dutch footballer
 Göran Rothman (1739–1778), Swedish naturalist and physician
 James Rothman (born 1950), American cell biologist and 2013 Nobel Laureate in Physiology or Medicine
Joni Robbins (born Joan Eva Rothman), American voice actress
 John Rothman (born 1949), American actor
 Judy Rothman, American screenwriter and lyricist
 Katherine Rothman
 Ken Rothman (1935–2019), American politician; Lieutenant Governor of Missouri
 Kenneth Rothman (epidemiologist) (born 1945)
 Lorraine Rothman (1932–2007), activist
 Louis Rothman (1869–1926), British tobacconist and founder of Rothmans International
 Makua Rothman (born 1984), American surfer
 Mark Rothman, American writer and producer of Laverne and Shirley
 M. A. Rothman, American inventor and speculative fiction writer
 Milton A. Rothman (1919–2001), American nuclear physicist
 Norman Rothman (1914–1985), American gangster
 Richard B. Rothman, pharmacologist
 Rodney Rothman, screenwriter
 Sandy Rothman (born 1946), bluegrass musician and producer
 Stephanie Rothman (born 1936), film director
 Steve Rothman (born 1952), politician
 Thomas Rothman (born 1954), CEO of FOX Filmed Entertainment
 Tony Rothman (born 1953), physicist

See also
 Rothman Center, a sports arena in Hackensack, New Jersey
 Rothman Healthcare, an American medical software company
 Rothmans (disambiguation)

Jewish surnames
German-language surnames
Yiddish-language surnames